North Kynouria or Vóreia Kynouría is a municipality in Arcadia, Greece. It is located in the eastern part of the regional unit, between the northwestern shores of the Argolic Gulf and northern Laconia. Its land area is 576.981 km². Its population is 10,341 (2011 census). The seat of the municipality is in Astros (pop. 2,408). Its largest other towns or villages are Ágios Andréas (pop. 1,065), Paralio Astros (1,043), Doliana (846), Ágios Pétros (717), Meligoú (684), Korakovoúni (659), Prastós (336) and Kastrí (335).

Subdivisions

The municipality is divided into 26 communities:
Agia Sofia
Agios Andreas (Agios Andreas, Arkadiko Chorio, Paralia Agiou Andreou)
Agios Georgios (Aetochori, Vathia, Melissi)
Agios Petros (Agios Petros, Moni Malevis, Xirokampi)
Astros (Astros, Agios Ioannis, Agios Stefanos, Varvogli, Iera Moni Loukous, Chantakia)
Charadros (Charadros, Agioi Asomatoi)
Doliana (Ano Doliana, Dragouni, Kato Doliana, Kouvlis, Prosilia, Rouneika)
Elatos
Tou Karatoula
Kastanitsa
Kastri
Korakovouni (Korakovouni, Neochori, Oreino Korakovouni)
Koutroufa
Meligou (Oreini Meligou, Agia Anastasia, Portes, Cheimerini Meligou)
Mesorrachi
Nea Chora
Oria
Paralio Astros
Perdikovrysi
Platana
Platanos
Prastos (Prastos, Agios Panteleimon, Moni Eortakoustis)
Sitaina
Stolos (Stolos, Fountoma)
Vervena (Vervena, Kato Vervena)
Xiropigado (Xiropigado, Metamorfosi, Plaka)

References

External links
North Kynouria from the University of Patras

Municipalities of Peloponnese (region)
Populated places in Arcadia, Peloponnese